The Lenborough Hoard is a hoard of more than 5,000 late Anglo-Saxon silver coins, dating to the eleventh century, that was found at Lenborough in Buckinghamshire, England in 2014. It is believed to be one of the largest hoards of Anglo-Saxon coins ever found in Britain. It is now on display at Discover Bucks Museum.

Discovery
The hoard was discovered, on 21 December 2014, on farmland in the Buckinghamshire hamlet of Lenborough, between Buckingham and Padbury, during a metal detectorist rally organised by the Weekend Wanderers Detecting Club involving approximately one hundred people. One of the participants, Paul Coleman, located the coins inside a lead container buried  under the ground.

Coleman said that he "found a piece of lead and thought it was junk. But then I looked back in the hole and saw one shiny coin. Then I lifted a larger piece of lead and saw row upon row of coins stacked neatly." According to Pete Welch, the founder of the club, the coins were in remarkably good condition: "They're like mirrors, no scratching, and buried really carefully in a lead container, deep down. It looks as though only two people have handled these coins, the person who made them and the person who buried them." They were found protected in a "lead parcel" in the local heavy clay soil.

Buckinghamshire County Museum archaeologist Ros Tyrell, the Buckinghamshire Finds Liaison Officer for the Portable Antiquities Scheme, was present during the rally to record any objects discovered, and excavated the hoard immediately after it was found. The hoard was taken to the British Museum for examination and conservation.

Contents
The hoard consists of 5,252 silver coins, of which 5,251 are whole and one is a portion of a coin that had been cut in half. They date from the first half of the eleventh century, and include many coins from the reigns of two Anglo-Saxon kings, Æthelred the Unready (reigned 978–1013 and 1014–1016) and Cnut the Great (reigned 1016–1035). The coins were wrapped in a sheet of lead.

As the hoard consists of precious metal more than 300 years old, it will be assessed by a coroner under the terms of the Treasure Act 1996 to determine whether it is treasure. If found to be so, the hoard will be valued by the Treasure Valuation Committee, and a museum may apply to acquire it by paying the amount of the valuation, which will be shared equally by the discoverer and the landowner. The coins are in such good condition that their total value has been estimated at possibly as much as £1.3 million.

The reasons for the burial of the hoard are unknown.

Valuation
In June 2016, the Treasure Valuation Committee valued the hoard at £1.35 million. Following a fundraiser the hoard is now on display at Discover Bucks Museum, previously Bucks County Museum.

See also
Staffordshire Hoard, a large hoard of Anglo-Saxon gold and silver metalwork

References

External links
 Bucks County Museum's appeal to raise money to buy the hoard
 The Weekend Wanderers Detecting Club's Xmas Special Dig Report (with many photographs)
 Video of the excavation of the hoard
 Photographs of the Lenborough Hoard (Portable Antiquities Scheme flickr account)

Anglo-Saxon archaeology
Archaeological sites in Buckinghamshire
History of Buckinghamshire
Metal detecting finds in England
2014 in England
2010s in Buckinghamshire
2014 archaeological discoveries
Hoards from Anglo-Saxon Britain